Revital Gottlieb (born 3 November 1975) is an Israeli lawyer and politician. She is currently a member of the Knesset for the Likud.

Biography 
Gottlieb was born on 3 November 1975 in Bnei Brak. Gottlieb has a Master's degree in Jurisprudence from Bar-Ilan University, and worked for a time for the State Attorney in Tel Aviv district. Since 2000, Gottlieb has worked as a lawyer, specializing in criminal law.

In 2016, Gottlieb ran for the chairmanship of the Israel Bar Association against Efi Nave, becoming the first woman to run for the office.

Until May 2022, Gottlieb participated in Channel 13's Shishi as a panelist.

Ahead of the April 2019 election, Gottlieb helped found Shavim, a political party meant to promote equality between parents and for those with disabilities. She given the second spot on the party's electoral list. The party proceeded to win 401 votes. During the 2022 election, She ran for a spot on the Likud's electoral list, and was elected to the twenty-fifth spot.

After Israeli settlers attacked the Palestinian village of Huwara, burning down dozens of houses and killing one civilian, Gottlieb drew attention for refusing to condemn the attacks.

Personal life  
Gottlieb is divorced and has three children, one of whom is autistic. She resides in Giv'at Shmuel.

References 

Living people
1975 births
People from Bnei Brak
Bar-Ilan University alumni
21st-century Israeli politicians
Members of the 25th Knesset (2022–)
Women members of the Knesset
Jewish Israeli politicians
Likud politicians